The State Register of Heritage Places is maintained by the Heritage Council of Western Australia. , 215 places are heritage-listed in the Shire of Broomehill-Tambellup, of which five are on the State Register of Heritage Places.

List

State Register of Heritage Places
The Western Australian State Register of Heritage Places, lists the following five state registered places within the Shire of Broomehill-Tambellup:

Shire of Broomehill-Tambellup heritage-listed places
The following places are heritage listed in the Shire of Broomehill-Tambellup but are not State registered:

References

Broomehill
 
Broomehill